The Nashua Formation is an early Pleistocene geologic formation in Florida. The fine to coarse quartz sands, fossiliferous quartz sands, and dark clays contain wood and brackish-water fossils.

It is a nearshore marine formation that occurs in a band 40 to 70 km wide along the Atlantic Coast of Florida.

Background

This is described as variably calcareous, shelly sand, and finely sandy shell coquina.

Deposited in open-marine, shallow-water on an inner neritic continental shelf. Underlies the St. Johns River area at least as far south as Deland, Volusia County.

Location

The formation's northern limit is in the vicinity of the St. Marys River and so it probably also occurs in Georgia. It grades westward and northward into the Cypresshead Formation.

The area overlies the Coosawhatchie Formation and underlies only undifferentiated surficial sand deposits in northeast Florida.

In the coastal area, it may be overlain by the Satilla Formation. The formation was measured in a well at Deland at 32 ft (10 m). The formation is probably a multi deposit formation.

Age
On the basis of foraminifera found, the unit was assigned an age range of late Pliocene to early Pleistocene.

Organisms

Barnacles, bryozoans, coral, crab claws, sand dollars and sea urchin spines have been found in this formation.

See also 

 List of fossiliferous stratigraphic units in Florida

References 

Geologic formations of Florida
Shallow marine deposits
Paleontology in Florida